Matt Goodwin (born July 15, 1970) is a former award-winning Canadian Football League linebacker and Grey Cup champion.

Goodwin played his college football at Iowa State and played professionally for 2 years with the Baltimore Stallions. In 1994 he won the CFL's Most Outstanding Rookie Award on the strength of his 17 games played, 54 defensive tackles, 3 interceptions, 3 sacks, 4 blocked punts and 4 fumble recoveries (3 returned for touchdowns.) In 1995 he had 50 tackles, 1 sack and 2 interceptions and was part of the Stallions Grey Cup winning team.

References

1970 births
Living people
Baltimore Stallions players
Canadian Football League Rookie of the Year Award winners
Players of Canadian football from Philadelphia